Agdistis caradjai is a moth in the family Pterophoridae. It is known from Turkey, Russia and Iran.

The wingspan is about 23 mm. The head smoothly is scaled and grey-brown. The thorax and abdomen are greyish brown and the forewings have a grey-brown ground colour.

References

Agdistinae
Moths of Asia
Moths described in 1975